The 1995 Lipton Championships was a combined men's and women's tennis tournament played on outdoor hard courts. It was the 11th edition of the Lipton Championships and was part of the Championship Series of the 1995 ATP Tour and of Tier I of the 1995 WTA Tour. The tournament took place at the Tennis Center at Crandon Park in Key Biscayne, Florida in the United States from March 17 through March 26, 1995. Andre Agassi and Steffi Graf won the singles titles.

Finals

Men's singles

 Andre Agassi defeated  Pete Sampras 3–6, 6–2, 7–6(7–3)
 It was Agassi's 3rd title of the year and the 28th of his career.

Women's singles

 Steffi Graf defeated  Kimiko Date 6–1, 6–4
 It was Graf's 3rd title of the year and the 100th of her career.

Men's doubles

 Todd Woodbridge /  Mark Woodforde defeated  Jim Grabb /  Patrick McEnroe 6–3, 7–6
 It was Woodbridge's 2nd title of the year and the 29th of his career. It was Woodforde's 2nd title of the year and the 34th of his career.

Women's doubles

 Jana Novotná /  Arantxa Sánchez Vicario defeated  Gigi Fernández /  Natasha Zvereva 7–5, 2–6, 6–3
 It was Novotná's 5th title of the year and the 68th of her career. It was Sánchez Vicario's 2nd title of the year and the 59th of her career.

See also 
 Agassi–Sampras rivalry

References

External links
 1995 ATP Calendar
 WTA Tour Final Results: 1971–2007

 
Lipton Championships
Lipton Championships
Miami Open (tennis)
Lipton Championships
Lipton Championships
Lipton Championships